Microvillus inclusion disease, previously known as Davidson's disease, congenital microvillus atrophy and, less specifically, microvillus atrophy (note: microvillus is often misspelled as microvillous), is a rare genetic disorder of the small intestine that is inherited in an autosomal recessive pattern.

Presentation
It is characterized by chronic, intractable diarrhea in new-born infants, starting in the first few days of life.
This results in metabolic acidosis and severe dehydration. Pregnancy and birth are usually normal.

Pathophysiology
It is caused by a congenital villus atrophy, atrophy of apical microvilli and intracellular accumulation of apical enzymes and transporters in the epithelial cells of the small intestine. MVID is in ost cases caused by mutations in the MYO5B gene. A minority of cases involves mutations in the STX3 gene.

Diagnosis
Prenatal screening in utero is currently offered by several medical centers since the gene(s) involved in the disease were recently discovered to be MYO5B; Diagnosis is typically made by biopsy of the small intestine.

Biopsy
The appearance of microvillous inclusion disease on light microscopy is similar to celiac sprue; however, it usually lacks the intraepithelial lymphocytic infiltration characteristic of celiac sprue and stains positive for carcinoembryonic antigen (CEA). The definitive diagnosis is dependent on electron microscopy.

Differential diagnosis
The differential diagnosis of chronic and intractable diarrhea is:
 Intestinal epithelial dysplasia
 Syndromatic diarrhea
 Immunoinflammatory enteropathy

Prognosis
It is nearly always fatal unless, like short bowel syndrome patients, treated with parenteral nutrition or an intestinal transplant. The patient is often classified as being in "intestinal failure" and treated with the cohort of patients known as "short bowel syndrome" patients.

One patient from the UK was documented as achieving nutritional independence at age 3. On 26 June 2009, a six-year-old girl with microvillus inclusion disease became the third person in the UK to die of swine flu. This was attributed to her weakened immune system.

Prevalence

Microvillus inclusion disease is extremely rare, however, no prevalence data have been published. An estimate of a few hundred children with the disease in Europe has been made but no time frame to which this count applies is given. Countries with a higher degrees of consanguinity experience higher prevalence rates due to its autosomal recessive transmission.

History
Microvillus inclusion disease was first described in 1978 by Davidson et al. It was originally described as familial enteropathy.

References

External links 

Gastrointestinal tract disorders
Autosomal recessive disorders
Rare diseases